The Eighth Wisconsin Legislature convened from January 10, 1855, to April 2, 1855, in regular session.

This was the first Wisconsin legislature seated after the establishment of the Republican Party of Wisconsin.

Senators representing odd-numbered districts were newly elected for this session and were serving the first year of a two-year term.  Assemblymembers were elected to a one-year term.  Assemblymembers and odd-numbered senators were elected in the general election of November 7, 1854.  Senators representing even-numbered districts were serving the second year of their two-year term, having been elected in the general election held on November 8, 1853.

Major events

 February 1, 1855: Charles Durkee elected United States Senator by the Wisconsin Legislature in Joint Session.
 November 6, 1855: In the 1855 Wisconsin gubernatorial election, incumbent William A. Barstow was initially declared the winner.  The election results were contested and eventually Coles Bashford, the Republican candidate, prevailed and became the next Governor of Wisconsin.

Major legislation

 March 8, 1855: Act to provide for the division of the County of Adams, and to submit the question to a Vote of the people, 1855 Act 28. The referendum passed and resulted in the creation of Juneau County from the western half of Adams County.
 March 23, 1855: Act relative to the rights of married women, 1855 Act 49. Granted married women the rights to own property and conduct business in circumstances where the husband had been negligent or otherwise irresponsible.

Party summary

Senate summary

Assembly summary

Sessions
 1st Regular session: January 10, 1855 – April 2, 1855

Leaders

Senate leadership
 President of the Senate: James T. Lewis, Lieutenant Governor
 President pro tempore: Eleazer Wakeley

Assembly leadership
 Speaker of the Assembly: Charles C. Sholes

Members

Members of the Senate
Members of the Wisconsin Senate for the Eighth Wisconsin Legislature (25):

Members of the Assembly
Members of the Assembly for the Eighth Wisconsin Legislature (82):

Employees

Senate employees
 Chief Clerk: Samuel G. Bugh
 Sergeant-at-Arms: William H. Gleason

Assembly employees
 Chief Clerk: David Atwood
 Sergeant-at-Arms: William Blake

References

External links

1855 in Wisconsin
Wisconsin
Wisconsin legislative sessions